Marcella "Sali" Grace Eiler (September 30, 1987 – September 15, 2008) was an American social activist from Eugene, Oregon who was raped and murdered in Mexico two weeks before her 21st birthday. For the last three years of her life, she had been living and working intermittently in Oaxaca's provincial capital, Oaxaca de Juárez, as a dance teacher and social activist, and acted as an observer for an indigenous rights organization.

Eiler's body was found on September 24, 2008 near the Oaxaca town of San José del Pacifico, where she had arrived to dance at a fundraiser. Newspapers reported that after Mexico City resident Omar Yoguez Singu admitted that he had killed Eiler with a machete, citizens oversaw his delivery into police custody. He was found guilty of murder and is serving sentence in a Oaxacan prison.

See also
Brad Will

References

Assassinated American activists
Deaths by blade weapons
People from Eugene, Oregon
1987 births
2008 deaths
Place of birth missing
People murdered in Mexico
Rape in Mexico